The Walt Disney Company Italia S.r.l. (formerly called The Walt Disney Company Italia S.p.A.) is The Walt Disney Company's Italian division and one of The Walt Disney Company's European divisions. The company was founded on 8 May 1938 as Creazioni Walt Disney S.A.I. The company also handles distribution and marketing for Disney+ in that region.

Divisions
 Walt Disney Studios Home Entertainment Italia
 Walt Disney Studios Motion Pictures Italia
 Disney Interactive Media Group Italia
 Disney Publishing Worldwide Italia
 Disney Consumer Products Italy
 Disney Store Italy
 Walt Disney Television Italia

Former divisions
 Disney Channel Italy
 Disney Junior (Italy) (Formerly Playhouse Disney)
 Disney XD (Italy) (Formerly Fox Kids and Jetix)
 Disney in English
 Toon Disney

Walt Disney Television Italy
The television division of the company produced series for Disney Channel Italy such as:
Alex & Co.
Penny on M.A.R.S.
Life Bites – Pillole di vita
Quelli dell'intervallo
Quelli dell'Intervallo Cafe
Quelli dell'intervallo in vacanza
Fiore e Tinelli
Casa Pierpiero
Chiamatemi Giò
In tour
Hip Hop Hurrà
Sara e Marti #LaNostraStoria

Quelli dell'intervallo (As the Bell Rings) and Life Bites have been subsequently adapted in several other countries, while In tour is an adaptation from Disney Spain's La Gira.

Publications
 Wizards of Mickey
 MM Mickey Mouse Mystery Magazine
 PKNA
 Topolino
 W.I.T.C.H.
 Monster Allergy
 Kylion

Design work
They designed the mascot (Foody) for the Expo 2015 in Milan.

See also
 The Walt Disney Company France
 List of Disney programs broadcast in Italy
 Mediaset

References

External links
 Disney Italy
 

Entertainment companies of Italy
Mass media companies of Italy
Italy
Companies based in Milan
Mass media companies established in 1938
Italian companies established in 1938
Disney comics publishers